Hyper may refer to:

Arts and entertainment
Hyper (2016 film), 2016 Indian Telugu film
Hyper (2018 film), 2018 Indian Kannada film
Hyper (magazine), an Australian video game magazine
Hyper (TV channel), a Filipino sports channel
Hyper+, a former Polish programming block on Teletoon+

Mathematics
Hypercube, the n-dimensional analogue of a square and a cube
Hyperoperation, an arithmetic operation beyond exponentiation
Hyperplane, a subspace whose dimension is one less than that of its ambient space
Hypersphere, the set of points at a constant distance from a given point called its centre
Hypersurface, a generalization of the concepts of hyperplane, plane curve, and surface
Hyperstructure, an algebraic structure equipped with at least one multivalued operation
Hyperbolic functions, analogues of trigonometric functions defined using the hyperbola rather than the circle

Other uses
DJ Hyper (born 1977), a British electronic musician
Hyper key, a modifier key on the space-cadet keyboard
Hyper engine, a hypothetical aircraft engine design
Hyper Island, a Swedish educational company
Europe Sails Hyper, an Austrian hang glider

See also
 
 
Hyperspace (disambiguation)
 Hyperactivity, a state in which a person is abnormally excitable and exuberant